Pyrausta generosa is a moth in the family Crambidae. It was described by Augustus Radcliffe Grote and Coleman Townsend Robinson in 1867. It is found in North America, where it has been recorded from Ontario to Alberta and to Florida and Missouri. The habitat consists of undisturbed areas in aspen parkland and mixed woods.

The wingspan is 18–21 mm. The forewings are dark brown with a pale yellowish postmedial line and a pale yellowish discal spot. Adults are on wing from late May to late July.

The larvae possibly feed on Mentha species.

References

Moths described in 1867
generosa
Moths of North America